Dactylomyia is a genus of flies in the family Dolichopodidae.

Species
 Dactylomyia bicolor (Van Duzee, 1933) – Guatemala
 Dactylomyia coruscans (Parent, 1928) – Costa Rica
 Dactylomyia decora (Aldrich, 1902) – Lesser Antilles (Grenada, St. Vincent, Barbados)
 Dactylomyia lateralis (Say, 1829) – Eastern North America (USA and Canada)
 Dactylomyia mexicana Naglis, 2002 – Mexico
 Dactylomyia parenti Naglis, 2002 – Costa Rica
 Dactylomyia vockerothi Bickel, 1998 – Hawaiian Islands

References

Dolichopodidae genera
Neurigoninae
Diptera of North America
Taxa named by John Merton Aldrich